Mamadu Samba Candé (born 23 September 1992), known as Sambinha, is a Bissau-Guinean professional footballer who played as a centre back for Israeli Premier League side Maccabi Bnei Reineh.

Club Career

New England Revolution

On October 1, 2014, the New England Revolution of Major League Soccer entered into a "strategic partnership" with Primeira Liga  club Sporting CP. The agreement allowed for the Revolution to bring in Sporting players on loan, as well as allow the clubs’ academy teams, youth players and coaches to spend training time with the other organization’s teams. Sambinha became the first player to join the Revolution as part of this deal, joining on a one year loan with an option to buy on January 22, 2016. Speaking on the signing, Revolution GM Mike Burns called Sambinha "a big, strong center back" and added that Sambinha "will be able to help strengthen our defense and we are grateful to be able to work with Sporting in order to add a player of his quality to our roster for the upcoming season."

Sambinha made his Revolution debut on May 14, 2016, coming on as a substitute for Juan Agudelo in the Revolution's 2-0 win over Chicago Fire FC. He would start his first match for the club on May 21, 2016 against FC Dallas.

Sambinha had his U.S. Open Cup debut on June 29, 2016 playing the full 90 minutes in the club's win over the New York Cosmos. He would start the Revolution's U.S. Open Cup Quarter Final win against the Philadelphia Union on July 20, 2016.

The New England Revolution waived Sambinha on August 29, 2016.

References

External links

CAF profile

1992 births
Living people
Sportspeople from Cascais
Portuguese footballers
Citizens of Guinea-Bissau through descent
Bissau-Guinean footballers
Association football defenders
Sporting CP B players
New England Revolution players
S.C. Covilhã players
NorthEast United FC players
S.U. 1º Dezembro players
A.C.R. Messina players
Olympiakos Nicosia players
Maccabi Bnei Reineh F.C. players
Liga Portugal 2 players
Segunda Divisão players
Major League Soccer players
Cypriot First Division players
Israeli Premier League players
Guinea-Bissau international footballers
Bissau-Guinean expatriate footballers
Expatriate soccer players in the United States
Expatriate footballers in India
Expatriate footballers in Italy
Expatriate footballers in Cyprus
Expatriate footballers in Israel
Bissau-Guinean expatriate sportspeople in the United States
Bissau-Guinean expatriate sportspeople in India
Bissau-Guinean expatriate sportspeople in Italy
Bissau-Guinean expatriate sportspeople in Cyprus
Bissau-Guinean expatriate sportspeople in Israel
Portuguese people of Bissau-Guinean descent